Epimecis is a genus of moths in the family Geometridae first described by Jacob Hübner in 1825.

Species
 Epimecis akinaria (Dognin, 1907)
 Epimecis amianta (Prout, 1929)
 Epimecis benepicta (Warren, 1906)
 Epimecis confertistriga (Bastelberger, 1907)
 Epimecis conjugaria (Guenée, 1857)
 Epimecis consimilis (Warren, 1905)
 Epimecis curvilinea (Warren, 1907)
 Epimecis detexta (Walker, 1860) - avocado spanworm moth
 Epimecis fraternaria (Guenée, 1857)
 Epimecis fumistrota (Warren, 1904)
 Epimecis funeraria (Schaus, 1927)
 Epimecis hortaria (Fabricius, 1794) - tulip-tree beauty
 Epimecis masica (Druce, 1892)
 Epimecis matronaria (Guenée, 1857)
 Epimecis mundaria (Walker, 1860)
 Epimecis patronaria (Walker, 1860)
 Epimecis plumbilinea (Warren, 1905)
 Epimecis pudicaria (Guenée, 1858)
 Epimecis scolopaiae (Drury, 1773)
 Epimecis semicompleta (Warren, 1905)
 Epimecis subalbida (Warren, 1900)
 Epimecis subroraria (Walker, 1860)
 Epimecis vexillata (Felder, 1874)

References

Boarmiini